The Mexican professional wrestling company Consejo Mundial de Lucha Libre  (CMLL) held a Mexican National Tag Team Championship tournament from February 28, through March 13, 2020. The tournament marked the return of the Mexican National Tag Team Championship to CMLL after a 28-year absence. A total of 16 teams competed in the tournament, with the teams of Templario/El Hijo del Villano III and Atlantis Jr./Flyer qualifying for the finals on March 13. In the end, the team of Atlantis Jr. and Flyer won the tournament to become the 42nd Mexican National Tag Team Champions.

Production

Background
In 1992, then reigning Mexican National Tag Team Champions Los Destructores, left CMLL and doing so taking the championship with them to AAA. The championship was defended in AAA from 1992 until 2007, and subsequently only defended twice more on the independent circuit before becoming dormant. La Parka, one half of the last recognized championship team, died on January 11, 2020. A couple of weeks later CMLL officially announced that they had regained control of the Mexican National Tag Team Championship and would be holding a tournament for the championship in February and March. During CMLL's February 19 Informa, they announced that the first block of the tournament would take place on the February 28 Super Viernes show.

Storylines
Tournament participants - Block A
Los Panteras (Black Panther and Blue Panther Jr.)
Dulce Gardenia and Fuego
Los Hijos del Infierno (Ephesto and Luciferno)
El Hijo del Villano III and Templario
Misterioso Jr. and El Sagrado
Pegasso and Stigma
Soberano Jr. and Titán
Universo 2000 Jr. and Virus
Tournament participants - Block B
Atlantis Jr. and Flyer
Audaz and Fugaz
Los Cancerberos del Infierno (Cancerbero and Raziel)
Esfinge and Drone
El Felino and Tiger
Pólvora and Vangellys
Rey Bucanero and Shocker
Rey Cometa and Star Jr.

Tournament brackets

Tournament results
February 28 Super Viernes (Block A)

March 6 Super Viernes (Block B)

March 13 Super Viernes (finals)

Footnotes

References

2020 in professional wrestling
Consejo Mundial de Lucha Libre tournaments